The 2016 Daytona 500, the 58th running of the event, was a NASCAR Sprint Cup Series race held on February 21, 2016, at Daytona International Speedway in Daytona Beach, Florida. Contested over 200 laps on the  asphalt superspeedway, it was the first race of the 2016 NASCAR Sprint Cup Series season. Denny Hamlin won the race in a photo finish over Martin Truex Jr. The top-five was rounded out by Kyle Busch, Kevin Harvick and Carl Edwards.

Chase Elliott won the pole for the race and led three laps before crashing out early in the race and finished 37th. Dale Earnhardt Jr., and Kyle Busch won the Duel races. Unlike Busch, Earnhardt Jr. crashed out with 29 laps to go and finished 36th.

Hamlin led a race-high of 95 laps on his way to winning the race. There were six caution flag periods for 31 laps and 20 lead changes among 15 different drivers.

This was the 27th career victory for Hamlin, first of the season, first at Daytona International Speedway and fifth win at the track for Joe Gibbs Racing. He left Daytona Beach with a five-point lead over Truex Jr. Toyota left with an eight-point lead over Chevrolet in the manufacturer standings.

The Daytona 500 was carried by Fox Sports on the broadcast Fox network for the American television audience. The radio broadcast for the race was carried by the Motor Racing Network and Sirius XM NASCAR Radio.

This event featured guest star WWE wrestler John Cena as a pace car driver.

This was the first Daytona 500 since 1992 and 1998 not featuring 3-time Daytona 500 winner Jeff Gordon and Tony Stewart on the starting grid. Gordon retired at the end of 2015 and called the 2016 race from the commentators to stand, and Stewart injured his back while riding a dune buggy outside San Diego. Also, this was the last Daytona 500 starts for Bobby Labonte, Robert Richardson Jr., Michael Annett, Brian Vickers, HScott Motorsports, and Carl Edwards.

Report

Background

Daytona International Speedway is a race track in Daytona Beach, Florida, that is one of six superspeedways to hold NASCAR races, the others being Auto Club Speedway, Indianapolis Motor Speedway, Michigan International Speedway, Pocono Raceway and Talladega Superspeedway. The track also features two other layouts that utilize portions of the primary high speed tri-oval, such as a  sports car course and a  motorcycle course. The track's  infield includes the  Lake Lloyd, which has hosted powerboat racing. The speedway is owned and operated by International Speedway Corporation.

The track was built to host racing that was being held by NASCAR founder Bill France Sr. at the former Daytona Beach Road Course and opened with the first Daytona 500 in 1959. The speedway has been renovated three times, with the infield renovated in 2004, and the track repaved in 1978 and 2010.

The Daytona 500 is regarded as the most important and prestigious race on the NASCAR calendar. It is also the series' first race of the year; this phenomenon is virtually unique in sports, which tend to have championships or other major events at the end of the season rather than the start. Since 1995, U.S. television ratings for the Daytona 500 have been the highest for any auto race of the year, surpassing the traditional leader, the Indianapolis 500 which in turn greatly surpasses the Daytona 500 in in-track attendance and international viewing. The 2006 Daytona 500 attracted the sixth largest average live global TV audience of any sporting event that year with 20 million viewers.

Changes

Restrictor plate
For the events of Speedweeks, the size of the holes in the restrictor plates was reduced from 29/32nd of an inch to 57/64th of an inch.

Race procedure
Changes were made to the green-white-checker procedure for this race and all races in 2016 with an "overtime line." The location of this line will vary from track to track, but it'll be located near the middle of the backstretch at most tracks. If the leader passes the line before a caution comes out, the race will end under caution. If a caution comes out before the leader passes the line, the field will be reset to their original spots and another restart will be attempted until a "clean restart" is achieved. These changes are in response to the botched final restart attempt in last October's 2015 CampingWorld.com 500 at Talladega at Talladega Superspeedway.

Entry list
The entry list for the Daytona 500 was released on Friday, February 12, at 12:05 p.m. Eastern time. Forty-four cars were entered for the race.

Following the 2015 Ford EcoBoost 400 at Homestead-Miami Speedway, a number of drivers attempted to run for a different team than they did in 2015. Chase Elliott, 2014 NASCAR Xfinity Series champion and son of 1988 Cup Series champion Bill Elliott, took over the No. 24 Hendrick Motorsports Chevrolet from the retired Jeff Gordon. Clint Bowyer took over the No. 15 (renumbered from No. 51) from Justin Allgaier. Brian Scott took over the No. 44 (renumbered from No. 9) from Sam Hornish Jr. Chris Buescher, reigning Xfinity Series champion, took over the No. 34 from Brett Moffitt and various of drivers. Landon Cassill took over the No. 38 from David Gilliland. David Ragan took over the No. 23 from Jeb Burton, and J. J. Yeley. Regan Smith took over the No. 7 from Alex Bowman. Brian Vickers drove the No. 14 in place of the injured Tony Stewart.

Practice

First practice (February 13)

Second practice (February 13)

Qualifying

Qualifying for the Daytona 500 is different from any other race weekend because the starting lineup for the race – except for the two drivers that post the two fastest timed laps in the final round of qualifying – isn't set on qualifying day. It sets the lineup for the two duel races the following Thursday.

Unlike qualifying at non-restrictor plate races, qualifying at Daytona International Speedway and Talladega Superspeedway consists of two rounds of cars being sent out one at a time to make a single timed lap. The fastest 12 advance to the final round to run for the pole position.

Elliott became the 6th rookie to win the pole for the Daytona 500 joining Loy Allen Jr. (1994), Jimmie Johnson (2002), David Gilliland (2007), Danica Patrick (2013), and Austin Dillon (2014). He said that today was "a very, very cool day. I don’t know that this opportunity has sunk in yet, much less sitting on the pole for the Daytona 500. I think the big thing is just the team and the Daytona 500 qualifying is about the team guys and the effort they put into these cars and it’s nothing special I did, it’s really what kind of work they did this off-season to make it happen."

After qualifying seventh and being all but guaranteed into the Daytona 500 based on speed, Ryan Blaney said that he "wasn't really too nervous going into today. I knew we had a really fast race car. We just had to do our job and we did it and we just had to lock ourselves in. I really wasn't feeling any different than I do any other day."

Likewise, Matt DiBenedetto – who was also all but guaranteed in on his speed after qualifying 24th – said that he could "sleep well, finally. I was really nervous all night. This is just a testament to the hard work from the guys on my team. Two-hundredths of a second. I'm really thankful, thankful to be racing in my first Daytona 500, most importantly. I'm really thankful and blessed to be here."

Martin Truex Jr. was unable to post a time over a roof flap issue. The Stewart Haas Racing cars of Kevin Harvick and Brian Vickers had their times disqualified after their track bars failed inspection.

Qualifying results

Practice (post-qualifying)

Third practice (February 17)

Fourth practice (February 17)
Kyle Larson and Michael Waltrip will start from the rear of the field in their respective Duel races after being involved in a four-car crash in turn 1.

Fifth practice (February 18)

Can-Am Duel

The Can-Am Duels are a pair of NASCAR Sprint Cup Series races held in conjunction with the Daytona 500 annually in February at Daytona International Speedway. The first race sets the lineup for cars that qualified in odd-numbered positions on pole qualifying day, while the second race sets the lineup for cars that qualified in even-numbered positions. The procedure for qualifying changed from the 2015 edition - the Duels now set the lineup for positions 3–38, while positions 39 and 40 are filled by the two "Open" (teams without a charter) cars that set the fastest times in qualifying, but did not lock in a spot in the Duels.

Race 1
Dale Earnhardt Jr. put on a clinic leading 43 of 60 laps on his way to scoring his fifth Can-Am Duel race victory. He said that it was "real special. I try not to make too big a deal, but I was thinking about that. I'm guilty of daydreaming a bit about winning this race tonight because of the date. That's very special to me, and I was glad that nothing bad happened, we didn't tear our car up, because that would have been embarrassing on a day like this." Michael McDowell raced his way into the Daytona 500 while Cole Whitt failed to make the race. He said that there was indeed "a lot going on in the off-season. Obviously there was a lot of unknowns with the charter, what was going to happen with that. There was a time where we felt like we were going to be in a tough spot, you know, that we weren't sure if we were going to be able to compete this year at all, whether an open car or charter car. Luckily we were able to put together the partnership with RCR, that alliance. Switching over to Chevy helped strengthen our position there. With Thrivent Financial and KLOVE and all our partners coming onboard, all our sponsors coming onboard, really partnering with Joe Falk at Circle Sport, allowed us to say…”

Race 2
Kyle Busch led 35 of 60 laps to score his third career Can-Am Duel win. He joked that his "plan was just to have everybody stay single-file and we take the checkered flag, but they didn’t see things the way I did." The race ended under caution after a multi-car wreck on the final lap in turn 1 that collected Jimmie Johnson, Matt Kenseth and Martin Truex Jr. Jamie McMurray said he "was trying to block the 48 (Jimmie Johnson). I had stalled out right when I got to the 18 car (Kyle Busch), and I didn’t think the 48 had much of a run either. It felt like our momentum was about the same. I saw the replay and I still don’t know if he was up to my rear bumper or if it was the air that made his car turn. I’m just not sure.” Johnson said that McMurray "was trying to get underneath the 18 and that didn’t work out, and I creeped up to his outside. He moved up quickly to defend that. I could tell I was going to be taken up into the wall. I tried getting out of there but kind of got into the fence, skipped off the wall and spun out in front of everybody. It was a lot gone wrong, I guess. It’s not like anything was intentional. It’s just a bummer to tear up a car after taking the white flag in a car that we tried so hard to protect and make so fast. There was just a lot gone wrong.” Robert Richardson Jr. transferred into the Daytona 500 while David Gilliland and Reed Sorenson failed to make the race. He said that he was "very, very honored to be a part of BK Racing, having another opportunity to run here at the Daytona 500. I’ve been in it once before, but this one is very, very special to me. My wife and I welcomed our brand-new baby boy who was born in early December. Every bit of earnings we get from this race is going to go into a college fund for him. It’s just the good Lord looking down on us and blessing us. Got to give all the glory to Him.”

Starting lineup

Practice (post-Duel)

Sixth practice (February 19)

Seventh practice (February 19)

Final practice (February 20)

Race

First half

Start
Under clear Florida skies, Chase Elliott led the field to the green flag at 1:33 p.m. He and teammate Dale Earnhardt Jr. jumped ahead of Joey Logano to control the field. Earnhardt drove underneath teammate Elliott to take the lead on lap 5. He took to blocking the advance of Logano and Denny Hamlin to hold the lead. Kyle Busch dove underneath Earnhardt going into turn 3 to take the lead on lap 19. The first caution of the race flew the same lap for a two-car wreck on the front stretch. Exiting turn 4, Elliott got loose, came down across the nose of Carl Edwards, slid down into the grass and destroyed the front of his car. He said that he "got in middle there a couple of laps before and got loose off of (turn) four and just lost it. I hate it. It had been such a fun week and you hate to end the race before it even got started. Just disappointed for everybody. We will just have to look past it and get on for Atlanta. That is the most important thing now. Can't get caught up in what happened today, it is irrelevant now. We'll try and get it fixed and make some laps. Then its on to Atlanta and if we can make some laps we will and move forward from here." Regan Smith also got turned in the tri-oval. Hamlin exited pit road with the race lead. Michael Waltrip was tagged for his crew being over the wall too soon and restarted the race from the rear of the field.

The race restarted at lap 26. After five laps, Hamlin pulled ahead of Kurt Busch and held the lead unopposed. Jimmie Johnson tried to lead the outside line up towards the front, but it began losing steam and fell back. Eventually, the field jumped to the bottom and ran single-file. The second caution of the race flew on lap 57 for a multi-car wreck on the front stretch. Exiting turn 4, Brian Vickers got loose, overcorrected, spun up the track, spun back down the track and came to a rest at the entrance of pit road. Trying to avoid hitting Vickers, Edwards got turned into the wall by Trevor Bayne who was trying to avoid hitting him as well. Hamlin and Martin Truex Jr. swapped the lead on pit road. Johnson exited pit road with the lead after taking just right-side tires.

Second quarter
The race restarted on lap 62. Johnson and Hamlin ran side-by-side for a number of laps. Eventually, the outside line stalled out and Johnson pulled ahead. It started to regain momentum after Johnson jumped to the top. Kyle Busch drove underneath Johnson in turn 2 to take the lead on lap 79. The third caution of the race flew on lap 92 for a multi-car wreck in turn 2. The wreck involved Matt DiBenedetto and Chris Buescher, who slammed the wall.  Buescher said it was "exponentially the hardest hit I’ve ever taken. It’s the first time I’ve ever had to be taken to the infield care center. That’s a bummer, but we’re fine.” DiBenedetto said he had "no excuse other than I messed up. It happens. We were clean last year, only involved in one accident in 35 races. I hate to start the year that way, but we’re going to be fine.” He would go on to finish 40th. Hamlin exited pit road with the race lead after taking just right-side tires. Michael Annett was tagged for his crew being over the wall too soon and restarted the race from the rear of the field.

Second half

Halfway
The race restarted on lap 100. The field started to form into three separate lines of racing. But just as quickly as it formed, it disappeared. Debris in turn 3 brought out the fourth caution of the race on lap 119. The debris came from Greg Biffle's car. Hamlin exited pit road with the race lead. Aric Almirola was tagged for an uncontrolled tire and restarted the race from the rear of the field.

The race restarted on lap 124. After making headway towards the front, the outside line fizzled out. It reformed and began moving back up towards the front. Denny Hamlin and the first five cars hit pit road to kick off a cycle of green flag stops. This handed the lead to Austin Dillon. He pitted the next lap and handed the lead to Brad Keselowski. He pitted the next lap and handed the lead to Annett. He pitted the next lap and the lead cycled to Kenseth. Johnson and Patrick were tagged for their crews being over the wall too soon and Waltrip was tagged for an uncontrolled tire. All three were forced to serve a pass-through penalty. Waltrip was black-flagged for not serving the penalty within three laps.

Fourth quarter

The fifth caution of the race flew with 29 laps to go for a single-car wreck in turn 4. Exiting the turn, Earnhardt got loose, turned down the track and slammed the inside wall. He said that he got caught "by surprise there. I was trying to sidedraft the guy beside me. We’ve been working on the balance all day. That was our problem. We underestimated how important handling was going to be today. We had a rocket all week. But in two-car runs and in night races the car handled great. We’ve got to do a little more drafting next time when we come back we’ll be ready for the balance. We were starting to move forward, getting aggressive. Just lost it.”

The race restarted with 25 laps to go. The sixth caution of the race flew with 18 laps to go for a two-car spin on the backstretch. Heading towards turn 3, Greg Biffle got into the left-rear corner panel of Patrick and sent her spinning through the grass. Her car hopped once through the air and the splitter dug into the ground. Biffle then overcorrected and side-slammed the wall. Patrick said that she was in a position that she "shouldn’t have been in. There is some confusion about whether there actually was a man over the wall too early. We shouldn’t have been racing for the lucky dog.”

The race restarted with 12 laps to go. Kenseth remained comfortably in the lead as the outside line continued to lose momentum. Kenseth had asked over the team radio that, since Toyota drivers occupied the top 5 places, they should work as a team until the final lap, at which point they would start racing each other so as to get a team victory and avoid wrecks. When the white flag waved for the final lap, Kevin Harvick in his Chevy drafted up the outside, overtaking the Toyota of Carl Edwards. Denny Hamlin saw the advancing Harvick and jumped to the outside line from 4th to block his advance, was bumped by Harvick on the back straight and drafted all the way to the front past Kyle Busch and Martin Truex and drew alongside his teammate Kenseth. Kenseth came down on Hamlin, got himself loose and fell back to finish 14th. Hamlin and Truex drag raced to the finish line and Hamlin prevailed by 0.010 seconds, the closest in Daytona 500 history.

Post-race
Hamlin said in victory lane that this win "is the best. I mean, it’s just the best. It’s the biggest race of my life. The Daytona 500 is – as a kid what you – this is the pinnacle of our sport and I’m just proud to be here. The last thing I wanted to do was wreck off turn four with my Toyota teammates and none of us win. We had talked about a plan overnight to just work together, work together and I’ve never seen it executed so flawlessly as what we did today.”

After coming up just short, Truex said he "did all I thought I could do. I had the lead. I probably should have run him up a little more, just lost in the last second. … Really proud of everybody. Really proud of the teamwork with the JGR guys. We're team players, and we're in it for the long haul with them. Congrats to Denny. He beat me by a couple of feet.”

After an injury kept Kyle Busch out of the previous year's Daytona 500, he said of his third-place finish that it was "definitely a lot better to be in the race where I’m supposed to be than standing on the sidelines watching across the street. It played out real well. We ran up front most of the day. We were probably the top (Joe Gibbs Racing) running car most of the day, but you have to lead the last laps and I didn’t get a chance to.”

After finishing sixth in his quest to repeat as Daytona 500 champion, Logano said that Harvick "got in front of me and we started moving and then the 11 (Hamlin) saw that and jumped up there and got the push from both of us and then it was a heck of a finish. I don’t like being behind watching it. I want to be involved with it. Overall it is a great start for our Shell Pennzoil team and we kicked off the season with a bunch of great finishes down here in Daytona and we are looking forward to getting to Atlanta."

After going from the lead to 14th on the final lap, Kenseth said that he "wouldn't trade that position for anybody in the whole field. I didn't really think the outside was going to muster up enough run to get it to be honest with you. Somehow, (Hamlin) just got a massive run. Hindsight I probably should have stayed in front of Martin and tried to race him back to the line. It looked like he was going so fast I could get in front of him and get a little boost and I just couldn't."

Race results

Race statistics
20 lead changes among 15 different drivers
6 cautions for 31 laps
Time of race: 3 hours, 10 minutes, 25 seconds
Average speed: 
Difference between 1st and 2nd: 0.01 seconds

Race awards
 Coors Light Pole Award: Chase Elliott (45.845)
 American Ethanol Green Flag Restart Award: Paul Menard
 Duralast Brakes "Bake In The Race" Award: Kyle Busch
 Ingersoll Rand Power Move: Michael McDowell (16 positions)
 MAHLE Clevite Engine Builder of the Race: Toyota Racing Development, #11
 Mobil 1 Driver of the Race: Denny Hamlin (139.1 driver rating)
 Moog Steering and Suspension Problem Solver of The Race: Carl Edwards (crew chief Dave Rogers (0.239 seconds))
 NASCAR Sprint Cup Leader Bonus:  No winner: rolls over to $20,000 at next event
 Sherwin-Williams Fastest Lap: A. J. Allmendinger
 Sunoco Rookie of The Race: Ryan Blaney

Media

Television

Since 2001 – with the exception of 2002, 2004 and 2006 – the Daytona 500 has been carried by Fox in the United States. The booth crew consisted of longtime NASCAR lap-by-lap announcer Mike Joy, three-time Daytona 500 champion Jeff Gordon, and 1989 race winner Darrell Waltrip. Pit road was manned by Jamie Little, Chris Neville, Vince Welch and Matt Yocum.

Radio
The race was broadcast on radio by the Motor Racing Network – which has covered the Daytona 500 since 1970 – and simulcast on Sirius XM NASCAR Radio. The booth crew consisted of longtime announcer Joe Moore, Jeff Striegle and 1989 Sprint Cup Series champion Rusty Wallace. Longtime turn announcer – and prodigy of MRN co-founder Ken Squier – Dave Moody was the lead turn announcer. He called the Daytona 500 from atop the Sunoco tower outside the exit of turn 2 when the field was racing through turns 1 and 2. Mike Bagley worked the backstretch for the Daytona 500 from a spotter's stand on the inside of the track. Kyle Rickey called the Daytona 500 when the field was racing through turns 3 and 4 from the Sunoco tower outside the exit of turn 4. On pit road, MRN was manned by lead pit reporter and NASCAR Hall of Fame Executive Director Winston Kelley. He was joined on pit road by Steve Post and Alex Hayden.

Standings after the race

Drivers' Championship standings

Manufacturers' Championship standings

Note: Only the first 16 positions are included for the driver standings.

Notes

References

2016 NASCAR Sprint Cup Series
2016 in sports in Florida
NASCAR races at Daytona International Speedway
February 2016 sports events in the United States